Dominique (also known as Dominique Is Dead) is a 1979 British horror film starring Cliff Robertson and directed by Michael Anderson. The film is based on the 1948 short story "What Beckoning Ghost" by Harold Lawlor, which had previously been adapted for American television as the first episode of the second season of Thriller, airing September 18, 1961.

Plot
David Ballard, a struggling businessman in desperate need of money, devises a plan to use psychological manipulation to drive his rich wife, Dominique, to suicide so he can inherit her fortune. His plan seemingly works when Dominique's body is found hanging in her greenhouse, but David soon finds himself being haunted by what he believes is Dominque's vengeful ghost. His sanity gradually crumbles as he finds himself unable to rid himself of his wife's spirit, until he finally falls to his death while trying to escape from her.

In a twist ending, the "ghost" turns out to be his half-sister, Ann; with the help of her lover, Tony Calvert, who had come to work as the Ballard's chauffeur and ingratiated himself to Dominique before her passing. Ann had used prosthetic makeup to impersonate Dominique, get rid of David, and claim David's share of the family fortune for herself, while Tony, being the only person Dominique trusted, became her beneficiary and got her fortune after David's death. However, Tony then plays her an audio recording that reveals that the real Dominque is still alive, and that Ann had helped her fake her death without Tony's knowledge. Tony admits that he intends to use the recording to force Dominque to give him full control of hers and David's money, and Ann murders him with a revolver the couple had previously used as part of their deception, with the movie ending on an ambiguous note as Ann stands over Tony's corpse.

Cast 
Cliff Robertson as David Ballard
Jean Simmons as Dominique Ballard
Simon Ward as Tony Calvert 
Jenny Agutter as Ann Ballard
Ron Moody as Dr. Rogers
Judy Geeson as Marjorie Craven
Michael Jayston as Arnold Craven
Flora Robson as Mrs. Davis
David Tomlinson as Lawyer
Jack Warner as George
Leslie Dwyer as Cemetery Supervisor
Jan Holden as Ballard's Secretary
Jack McKenzie as John, 1st Chauffeur
Michael Nightingale as Vicar at Funeral

Production

Filming dates
Filming started in England during September 1977 and lasted six weeks.

Filming locations
The film was initially meant to be filmed in Canada, but this was changed after an offer was made to shoot the film in England with a higher budget.

Release 
Dominique was initially released in March 1979. After a very brief theatrical run, it found larger visibility in cable airings.

Home video
Vinegar Syndrome later released the film on home video in 2019.

Reception
Martyn Auty criticized the film in the Monthly Film Bulletin as "heavy handed". Pop Matters reviewed the film in 2019, writing that it "won’t raise the hackles of anyone looking for deep scares, but it is an absorbing suspense-drama that will at least keep you in your seat, if not the edge of it."

References

External links 

1979 films
British horror films
1979 horror films
1970s thriller films
Films based on short fiction
Films directed by Michael Anderson
1970s English-language films
1970s British films